Polyipnus spinifer is a species of ray-finned fish in the genus Polyipnus. It lives in deep water environments in the Western Pacific Ocean.

References 

Sternoptychidae
Fish described in 1979